Liubotyn (translit. Lyubotyn) is a city in Kharkiv Raion, Kharkiv Oblast (province) of eastern Ukraine. It hosts the administration of Liubotyn urban hromada, one of the hromadas of Ukraine.  Population:

History
The city was established in 1650 by Ukrainian Cossacks from the right-bank Ukraine.

During World War II, Liubotyn was under German occupation from 20 October 1941 to 22 February 1943 and again from 9 March to 29 August 1943.

Until 18 July 2020, Liubotyn was incorporated as a city of oblast significance and the center of Liubotyn Municipality. The municipality was abolished in July 2020 as part of the administrative reform of Ukraine, which reduced the number of raions of Kharkiv Oblast to seven. The area of Liubotyn Municipality was merged into Kharkiv Raion.

Gallery

Notable people 
The following people have been born or have lived in Liubotyn:
 Oleg Khudolii — Ukrainian researcher, Doctor of Physical Education and Sports, full professor, academician of the Higher School Academy of Sciences of Ukraine.
 Oleg Goltvyansky (1980) — is a Ukrainian far-right politician and the leader of political party Ukrainian National Union. He was the commander of the volunteer Pechersk Battalion.
 Roman Kost (1984) — Ukrainian sculptor, master of artistic forging.

References

External links
 lubotin.com - Informative city portal
 www.lubotin.kharkov.ua - Official website of Liubotyn City Council 

Cities in Kharkiv Oblast
Valkovsky Uyezd
Cities of regional significance in Ukraine
Populated places established in 1650
Cities and towns built in the Sloboda Ukraine